Docomomo International (sometimes written as DoCoMoMo or simply Docomomo) is a non-profit organization whose full title is: International Committee for Documentation and Conservation of Buildings, Sites and Neighbourhoods of the Modern Movement.

Mrinalini Rajagopalan, author of "Preservation and Modernity: Competing Perspectives, Contested Histories and the Question of Authenticity," described it as "the key body for the preservation of modernist architecture".

History
Its foundation was inspired by the work of ICOMOS, the International Council on Monuments and Sites, established in 1965. The work of Icomos was concerned with the protection and conservation of historical buildings and sites, whereas Docomomo was founded to take up the challenge of the protection and conservation of Modern Architecture and Urbanism.

Docomomo International was founded in Eindhoven in 1988 by Dutch architects Hubert-Jan Henket and Wessel de Jonge. Henket chaired Docomomo International with de Jonge as secretary until September 2000 when the International Secretariat relocated to Paris, where it was hosted by the Cité de l’Architecture et du Patrimoine, in the Palais de Chaillot. The chair was Maristella Casciato, architect and architectural historian; with Émilie d'Orgeix, architectural historian, as secretary and Anne-Laure Guillet as director.

In 2008 there were 2,000 individual members. That year, 49 countries had national chapters and working parties of Docomomo. In 2010, the International Secretariat was relocated to Barcelona, hosted by the Fundació Mies van der Rohe. Ana Tostoes, architect and architect historian, chaired Docomomo International with Ivan Blasi, architect, as secretary. In 2014 the secretariat was transferred to the Instituto Superior Técnico at Lisbon, Portugal. Professor Tostoes remained as chair, with Zara Ferreira as secretary.

Conferences and seminars
Docomomo holds biennial international conferences where the people related to conservation issues gather and exchange information and studies pertaining to their scholarly research. The list of conferences held until now is as follows:

The International Scientific Committee on Technology (ISC/T) organizes seminars covering the following themes: restoration of reinforced concrete structures, curtain-wall facades, windows and glass, wood and the modern movement, colours in modern architecture and stone in modern buildings.

Seminars and conferences are often held in key modernist buildings, as for instance at Alvar Aalto’s Vyborg Library (2003 ISC/T seminar), Brinkman and Leendert van der Vlugt's Van Nelle factory in Rotterdam (2008 Conference), and Gordon Bunshaft's Lever House in New York (closing party at 2004 Conference).

Publications
The docomomo Journal is an international periodical that, since 1990, regularly summarizes recent research on the sites and buildings of Modern Movement. It is a bi-annual publication  featuring articles by noted architecture practitioners and scholars, addressing all facets of Modern Movement architecture, from history and design concepts to conservation, technology or education.

Work at national level
Many countries have national Docomomo working parties, as either part of academic establishments or architecture federations. They may define gazetteers of important structures to be protected, such as DoCoMoMo Key Scottish Monuments and DoCoMoMo Architectural Masterpieces of Finnish Modernism, or support local campaigners.

Preservation work by Docomomo together with others was recognised by the New Jersey Department of Environmental Protection after a 2009 charrette to protect the former Bell Labs Holmdel Complex.

References

Further reading
 Guillet, Anne-Laure (projects manager, Docomomo International, Cité de l'architecture et du Patrimoine, Paris).Docomomo International. Modernity as Heritage." Journal of Architectural Conservation. Volume 13, Issue 2, 2007. p. 151-156. DOI: 10.1080/13556207.2007.10785002. Published online: 16 January 2014.

External links 
Docomomo International
Docomomo United States
Docomomo International (Archive) - Delft University of Technology

Historic preservation
Modernist architecture
Conservation and restoration organizations